SS Charles D. Walcott was a Liberty ship built in the United States during World War II. She was named after Charles D. Walcott, an American geologist, paleontologist, and government administrator. Walcott served as the Director of the US Geological Survey from 1894-1907, and as Secretary of the Smithsonian Institution from 1907-1921.

Construction 
Charles D. Walcott was laid down on 29 September 1944, under a Maritime Commission (MARCOM) contract, MC hull 2327, by J.A. Jones Construction, Panama City, Florida; sponsored by Miss Eva Pearl Parker, a yard employee in the fabrication shop, and launched on 7 November 1944.

History
She was allocated to American Export Lines Inc., 13 November 1944. On 30 December 1947, she was placed in the National Defense Reserve Fleet, in Wilmington, North Carolina.

She was sold for scrapping, 31 January 1961, to Commercial Metals Co., for $46,588.18. She was withdrawn from the fleet, 26 July 1961.

References

Bibliography 

 
 
 
 

 

Liberty ships
Ships built in Panama City, Florida
1944 ships
Wilmington Reserve Fleet